Shurabeh-ye Vosta (also Romanized as Shūrābeh-ye Vosţá; also known as Shūrābeh) is a village in Kunani Rural District, Kunani District, Kuhdasht County, Lorestan Province, Iran. At the 2006 census, its population was 181, in 35 families.

References 

Towns and villages in Kuhdasht County